The discography of American rapper Mac Lethal consists of 5 studio albums, 12 mixtapes, 6 extended plays, and 27 singles (including nine as a featured artist).

Albums

Studio albums

Mixtapes
 The Love Potion Collection (2003)
 The Love Potion Collection 2 (2006)
 The Love Potion Collection 3 (2006)
 The Love Potion Collection 4 (2007)
 The Crown Prime Rib Mixtape (2008)
 The Love Potion Collection 5 (2009)
 Black Clover Presents Aged Barrel Series 1: Original 11:11 (2009)
 Black Clover Presents Aged Barrel Series 2: Moonthinker (2009)
 Blood in the Water Mixtape (2010)
 The Love Potion Collection 6 (2010)
 North Korean BBQ (2011)
 The Love Potion Collection 7: The Hair Years (2011)

Extended plays
 Moon Thinker (2001)
 Nine Situations (2003)
 Digital Love Potion (2008)
 Daytrotter Session (2008)
 Fast as Hell Though (2011)
 Postcards from Kansas City (2014)

Singles

As lead artist

As featured artist

Guest appearances

References

Discographies of American artists
Hip hop discographies